Ira Branch Johnson (September 17, 1880 – November 30, 1950) was an American college football player and coach.  He was the seventh head football coach at the Virginia Military Institute (VMI) in Lexington, Virginia, serving for two seasons, from 1905 to 1906, and compiling a record of 6–9–1.

During World War I, Johnson served as Captain, Battery C, 111th Field Artillery, 29th Division, prior to his discharge on June 11, 1918. He later worked as an assistant superintendent at the assembly plant in the Bartlett-Hayward industrial complex, an important Baltimore manufacturer.

At the time of his death, he was a municipal judge in Richmond, Virginia. He was married at least twice, to Mary Louise Herbert in 1906 and later to Jeanne Boutin.

Born in Woodville, North Carolina, he was the brother of Hammond Johnson.

Head coaching record

References

External links
 

1880 births
1950 deaths
American football guards
American football tackles
Virginia Cavaliers football coaches
Virginia Cavaliers football players
VMI Keydets football coaches
VMI Keydets football players
All-Southern college football players
United States Army officers
United States Army personnel of World War I